The Asău is a left tributary of the river Trotuș in Romania. Its source is located in the Tarcău Mountains. It discharges into the Trotuș in the village Asău, near Comănești.

Tributaries

The following rivers are tributaries to the river Asău (from source to mouth):

Left: Asăul Mic, Geamănele Mari, Izvorul Negru, Rugina, Rășcoiu, Păltiniș, Izvorul Alb, Pârâul Tulbure
Right: Preotese, Cetățeni, Pârâul Caprei, Pârâul lui Iacob, Agăstin, Barta, Chicera

References

Rivers of Romania
Rivers of Bacău County